Aero VIP may refer to the following airlines:

 Aero VIP (Argentina)
 Aero VIP (Portugal)